Japanese Earth Resources Satellite 1 (JERS-1) was a satellite launched in 1992 by the National Space Development Agency of Japan (NASDA, now part of JAXA).  It carried three instruments:
An L-band (HH polarization) synthetic aperture radar (SAR);
A nadir-pointing optical camera (OPS);
A side-looking optical camera (AVNIR).

The satellite operated until 1998 and re-entered the Earth's atmosphere in 2001.

References 
ESA third party missions overview

Earth observation satellites of Japan
Spacecraft launched in 1992
Spacecraft which reentered in 2001
Space synthetic aperture radar